List of Iranian video games (developed and published)

References

 
Iran